Invasion! may refer to:

Media
 Invasion!, a four-book Star Trek mini-series
 Invasion!, the first play by Swedish writer Jonas Hassen Khemiri
 Top of the Food Chain (released in the US as Invasion!), a 1999 Canadian comedy-horror film

Comics
 Invasion! (2000 AD), a 1977–1978 comic series
 "Invasion!" (Arrowverse), the third annual Arrowverse crossover event
 Invasion! (DC Comics), a three-issue comic book limited series and crossover event published 1988–1989

See also
 Invasion
 Invasion (disambiguation)